Christians in Bangladesh account for 0.30% (roughly 500,000 believers) of the nation's population as of 2022 census. Together with Judaism and Buddhism (plus other minority religious groups such as Atheism, Sikhism, the Bahá’í Faith and others), they account for 1% of the population. Islam accounts for 91.04% of the country's religion, followed by Hinduism at 7.95% as per 2022 census.

History 

The introduction and development of Christianity in the Indian Subcontinent can be traced back to several different periods, with the help of several different countries and denominations. The earliest connection to Christianity can be linked back to the arrival of the Apostle Thomas to the Malabar Coast during the first century, in 52 A.D. In addition, the Apostle had managed to convert several thousands of Hindu Brahmins, as they were "attracted" to the lifestyle and were "impressed" by Jesus' sacrifice.

Christianity did not have a presence in Bangladesh until the arrival of the Portuguese in 1510 with individuals like Alfonso de Albuquerque and Portuguese missionaries. Albuquerque attempted to spread Christianity by encouraging inter-marriage with native Bengali women, therefore their descendants were the first generations of Christians. By 1514, the Portuguese had obtained the right to preach Christianity in Bengal, thanks to the agreement between the Catholic Pope and the King of Portugal.

In 1672, Dome Antonio da Rozari, a young Bengali convert, had managed to convert 20,000 low-caste Hindus into Christianity. Afterwards, between the seventeenth and eighteenth centuries, Portuguese missionaries were evangelising and preaching in the Bengali language. Soon on, evangelical books and Christian theology were being written in Bengali.

In 1740, the first Protestant, Reverend John Zachariah Kiernander, arrived in Bangladesh. In 1770, he funded and built a Protestant church called "Mission Church" in West Bengal.

By the 18th century, British missionaries, such as William Carey, had built more churches, translated the Bible and other Christian books, and had set up religious schools. British missionaries had also developed Christian newspapers (such as "Digdarshan", "The Gospel Magazine", and "The Christian Mohila") in an effort to spread the gospel.

In more recent times, the rise of Christianity in Bangladesh can be credited to Western NGOs and Christian charities, who provided humanitarian work after the Liberation War in 1971. 

Since then, these NGOs and charities (see Contributions) have not only assisted with support for emergency relief, healthcare, and education in Bangladesh, but they have also encouraged the practice of reading the Bible. Currently, it is estimated that there are approximately 17 000 to 23 000 NGOs in Bangladesh.

In the Bangladesh Liberation War (March–December 1971), a significant number of Bangladeshis left Islam to join Christianity (because missionaries stood with them during their difficult times during the civil strife) or to atheism after 1971 due to their experience of oppression conducted by fellow Muslims from West Pakistan.

History of churches 
During the month of January in 1600, the first church was officially inaugurated. The church was named "The Church of the Holy Name of Jesus" and was built by the Jesuits, who were not only given permission, but also financial support and land by the King of Jessore.

The second church was financially supported by the Arakanese King and was built by Andre Boves on June 24, 1600. This church was built in Chittagong and was called "St. John the Baptist Church".

In 1601, the third church was built by Dominicans in the south-east of Chittagong. Eventually these churches were burnt down from the attacks by the Arakanese.

William Carey and missionaries 
According to Sufia M. Uddin, William Carey can be seen as "one of the most important early Christian missionary figures". Carey had arrived in Bangladesh in 1773, where he was financially supported by the Baptist Missionary Society to carry out missionary work. Carey believed his success as a missionary, was due him learning the Bengali language and therefore being able to translate the gospel. 

In 1801, he was able to publish a translation of The New Testament, which was the first translation in any South Asian language. Carey then published a Bengali dictionary ("A Dictionary of the Bengali language") that same year and was also appointed as a professor at Fort William College. Carey, with the assistance of Joshua Marshman and William Ward created Serampore College.

Carey's colleagues and missionary team built a Bengali boys' school and by 1817, they were operating 45 boys' schools. As for girls, in 1818 they opened their first Bengali girls' school and by 1824, they were running 6 girls' schools. These mission-run schools would often attract students with scholarships and accommodation. 

Carey also oversaw the works the Bible being translated into more than 34 Indian languages, while the missionaries wrote books and tracts favouring the Christian lifestyle. These books and tracts (such as "Prophet's Testimony in Christ", "God's Punishment of Sin", and "Krishna and Christ Compared") not only emphasised the benefits of Christian life, but reportedly condemned Hindu and Islamic beliefs.

Female missionaries 
In 1822, Miss Mary Anne Cooke was one of the first English female missionaries. Prior to this in 1820, missionary William Ward had encouraged for English women to preach Christianity, in order to connect more with Bengali women. With help from the Christian Missionary Society, Cooke founded 15 girls' schools with around 300 students within the Calcutta area.

Sister Argerita Bellasiny, Sister Brigida Janella, and Sister Agostina Bigo from Italy were called upon Father Marietti  on 17 May 1868 to help with missionary outreach. The three would spread Christianity by going door to door, particularly focusing on poor and vulnerable widows.

First Christian martyr 
Father Francisco Fernandez was the first martyr in Bangladesh; he died on 14 November 1602. He was led to his death because he had attempted to save Christian women and children from being captured and used as slaves by the Arakanese who are Buddhists. He was detained, chained, and beaten to death.

Contributions

Christians have greatly served the education and health sectors. This tiny community has some 1000 schools and about 100 health care centers and hospitals. In Bangladesh, the Christian community runs the country's largest cooperative bank in Dhaka.

Having worked in Bangladesh as a missionary since 1952, Father Richard William Timm, C.S.C. won the Ramon Magsaysay Award for Peace and International Understanding, the Asian Nobel Prize, in 1987 in recognition of his work as a teacher, as a biologist studying plant-parasitic worms, and with Caritas on relief efforts.

In the 1990s, many people opposed the aid of Christian NGOs, and therefore there was a spike in the number of protests and violence opposing the religious influence of Christian NGOs. Up to 52 NGOs were considered to be "anti-Islamic", with the intentions of "proselytising" the Islamic nation to Christianity, targeting the vulnerable; the outcasts, the uneducated, and the poor.

Persecution

Given the country's Islamic culture, Christians in Bangladesh often face the pressure from radical Islamic groups or threats (such as persecution and harassment) from the wider community. In 2019, several churches, such as Mohandi Assemblies of God church, were either burnt down or destroyed. To combat this, Christians would gather in secret or in small houses to practice their religion. Additionally, in 2020, it's alleged that several Christians have been detained by police for "unlawful conversion".

Conditions have improved in recent years as Bangladesh moved from place 35 on the World Watch List of Christian persecution in 2015 to place 48 in 2019. However, a sharp rise of violence against Christians in 2019 sent the country back to number 38 on the list.

Other attacks on Christians 
On 3 June 2001, there was a bomb attack during mass in a Catholic church located in Baniarchor; the attack had killed nine people.

An Italian aid worker, Cesare Tavella was shot and killed in 2015. Parolari Piero, an Italian priest and doctor was shot several times in 2015.

In 2016, a Christian businessman named Sunil Gomes was hacked to death.

On 1 July 2016, 20 hostages were massacred by a group of Islamic militants.

Pastor Luke Sarkar of Faith Bible Church was attacked on 5 October 2015 and his throat was cut with a sharp knife but he survived.

Dioceses
There are two Catholic archdioceses and six Catholic dioceses in Bangladesh with some 400,000 Catholics. Each diocese is led by its own local bishop. Cardinal Patrick D'Rozario is the highest Catholic official.

The Archdiocese of Dhaka comprises:
 The diocese of Dinajpur
 The diocese of Mymensingh
 The diocese of Rajshahi
 The diocese of Sylhet

The archdiocese of Chittagong comprises:
 The diocese of Barisal
 The diocese of Khulna

The diocese of Dhaka was created in 1952 and Rev. James D. Blair was assigned as the first Bishop (Markham, Hawkins IV, Terry & Steffensen, 2013). Following Blair, the first indigenous Bishop of the Diocese of Dhaka was assigned to Rev. B.D. Mondal. By the late 1980s, it was decided that a second diocese was needed, and this was established in Kusthia (Markham et al., 2013).

List of Protestant denominations
 Assemblies of God
 Bangladesh Baptist Sangha
 Bangladesh Lutheran Church
 Christian Brethren
 Church of Bangladesh (united church of Anglicans, Presbyterians, and others; member of the Anglican Communion)
 Church of God (Anderson)
 Garo Baptist Convention
 Seventh-day Adventist Church
 Church of the Nazarene
 Presbyterian Church of Bangladesh
 Isa-e Church

List of Baptist Churches
 Bangladesh Baptist Church Sangha
 Bangladesh Baptist Fellowship
 Garo Baptist Convention

Christian theological education 
There are 16 Christian theological institutions in Bangladesh.
 A G Bible College (Assemblies of God) was created in 1995.
 Agape College (Baptist) was created in 2003.
 Bangladesh Institution of Christian Theology (inter-denominational) was created in 1996.
 Bangladesh Theological Seminary (inter-denominational) was created in 1989.
 Center for Religious Studies (Presbyterian) was created in 2004.
 Christian Discipleship Centre (inter-denominational) was created in 1979.
 College of Christian Theology in Bangladesh (inter-denominational) was created in 1968.
 Faith Bible School was created in 2002.
 Gloria Theological Seminary (inter-denominational) was created in 1996.
 Grace Presbyterian Theological Seminary (inter-denominational) was created in 2004.
 Holy Spirit Major Seminary (Catholic) was created in 1973.
 Isa-e Training Institute (Protestant) was created in 2006.
 Methodist Theological Seminary (Methodist) was created in 1992.
 St. Andrews Theological Seminary (Anglican) was created in 1978.
 St. Joseph Seminary (Roman Catholic) was created in 1948.
 The Salvation Army Officer Training College was created in 1993.

Christian media
The Catholic weekly magazine, Pratibeshi, was founded in 1941 as Ranikhong Mission Chithi, a monthly parish bulletin. In the mid 1940s, it took its present name and moved to Dhaka. The magazine is one of the oldest Bengali and Catholic newspapers. In 2013, Pratibeshi launched an online news site with a focus on broad news coverage.

Radio Veritas Asia began their Bengali service in 1980. It is jointly produced in Dhaka and Kolkata.

Culture adoptions 
The Catholic community have adopted the Hindu use of the sindhur.

Christian Education in Bangladesh 

Notre Dame University Bangladesh
Notre Dame College, Dhaka
Notre Dame College, Mymensingh
St. Joseph Higher Secondary School
YWCA Higher Secondary Girls School
St. Gregory's High School and College
St. Francis Xavier's Girls' High School
A. G. Church School
Bangladesh Adventist Nursing College - BANC
Holy Cross College, Dhaka
Holy Cross Girls' High School (Dhaka)
Saint Philip's High School and College
Saint Placid's High School

See also
National Council of Churches in Bangladesh
Christianity in Myanmar
Christianity in India
Christianity in the Middle East

References

Further reading